Albert Minczér (born 1 October 1986, in Esztergom) is a Hungarian athlete. He competed in the 3000 m steeplechase event at the 2012 Summer Olympics.

Competition record

References

External links
 

1986 births
Living people
People from Esztergom
Hungarian male steeplechase runners
Hungarian male long-distance runners
Olympic athletes of Hungary
Athletes (track and field) at the 2012 Summer Olympics
Sportspeople from Komárom-Esztergom County
21st-century Hungarian people